Upper Magdalena Province is one of the 15 provinces in the Cundinamarca Department, Colombia. Upper Magdalena borders to the west with the Magdalena River and the Tolima Department, to the north with the Central Magdalena Province, to the east with the Tequendama Province and to the southeast with the Sumapaz Province.

Upper Magdalena contains eight municipalities:
 Agua de Dios
 Girardot
 Guataquí
 Jerusalén
 Nariño
 Nilo
 Ricaurte
 Tocaima

References

External links 
  Upper Magdalena Province in Cundinamarca

Provinces of Cundinamarca Department